Kevin Curren and Steve Denton were the defending champions, but did not participate this year.

Peter Fleming and John McEnroe won the title, defeating Henri Leconte and Yannick Noah 6–2, 6–3 in the final.

Seeds
All seeds receive a bye into the second round.

Draw

Finals

Top half

Bottom half

References
Draw

U.S. Pro Indoor
1984 Grand Prix (tennis)